Virtuozzo is a software company that develops virtualization and cloud management software for cloud computing providers, managed services providers and internet hosting service providers. The company’s software enables service providers to offer Infrastructure as a service, Container-as-a-Service, Platform as a service, Kubernetes-as-a-Service, WordPress-as-a-Service and other solutions.

History
The company was founded as SWsoft in 1997 as a privately-held server automation and virtualization company. In 2000, the company released the first commercially available operating system-level virtualization container technology. In 2003, SWsoft acquired the makers of Confixx and Plesk web hosting products: Plesk Server Administration (PSA) control panel and Confixx Professional hosting software. Virtuozzo was the core enabling technology behind SWsoft's HSP Complete solution. In 2004, SWsoft acquired Parallels, Inc.

In 2005, the company open-sourced its operating system-level virtualization technology as OpenVZ. In 2007, SWsoft announced that it had changed its name to Parallels and would distribute its products under the Parallels name. 

In December 2015, Virtuozzo was spun out from Parallels to become a standalone company. In May 2016, Virtuozzo announced its intention to join the Open Container Initiative.

In July 2021, Virtuozzo acquired OnApp. In October of that year, the company acquired Jelastic.

List of products
 Virtuozzo Hybrid Infrastructure is an OpenStack-based cloud management platform that enables service providers to sell public cloud, private cloud, hybrid cloud, Kubernetes-as-a-Service, Storage as a Service, Backup-as-a-Service, Disaster Recovery-as-a-Service and Desktop-as-a-Service.
 Virtuozzo Hybrid Server enables service providers to sell Virtual Private Servers, shared web hosting, container hosting and Storage as a Service.
 Virtuozzo Application Platform enables service providers to sell Platform as a Service with integrated DevOps tools
 Virtuozzo Application Platform for WordPress enables service providers to sell Platform as a Service for WordPress-based websites
 Virtuozzo Cloud Platform for VMware is a self-service cloud management, provisioning and billing portal for VMware vCenter environments
 Virtuozzo CDN Platform enables service providers to create their own Content Delivery Network services

Open-source products
 OpenVZ is an operating-system-level virtualization technology for Linux
 VzLinux is a Linux distribution that is based on the source code of Red Hat Enterprise Linux (RHEL)
 CRIU is a software tool that is used to freeze and restore running Linux applications 
 P.Haul - Python-based mechanism on top of CRIU, intended for live migration of containers and memory-touching processes inside. 

Virtuozzo is a contributor to other open-source projects, including the Linux kernel, libvirt, KVM, Docker, QEMU, LXC, runc/libcontainer and Libct.

Acquisitions

References 

Virtualization software
Software companies based in Washington (state)
Linux